The 99th Division was formed in October 1950 from the 3rd Garrison Brigade of the Huadong Military Region.

In May 1952, the division was reorganized as the 5th Construction Engineer Division.

In May 1955, the 5th Construction Engineer Division was demobilized and became China Construction Second Engineering Bureau, a part of China State Construction Engineering Corporation.

References

Infantry divisions of the People's Liberation Army
Military units and formations established in 1950
Military units and formations disestablished in 1952